The discography of American country music artist Gretchen Wilson consists of twenty-three singles and seven studio albums.

Wilson was propelled to fame by her No. 1 2004 hit "Redneck Woman", which spent a total of 5 weeks at No. 1 on the Country Songs chart. The song's album, Here for the Party has sold 5 million copies in the United States to date, and produced three additional Top 10 hit singles on the Billboard Country Chart between 2004 and 2005. Her second album, All Jacked Up sold a million copies in the United States. The title track was the album's most-successful single, reaching No. 8 on the country chart. Her third album, One of the Boys did not produce any Top 20 country hits out of the three singles released, however, the album debuted at No. 1 on the Billboard Top Country Albums chart.

In 2008, Wilson released the lead-off single to her fourth studio album, "Don't Do Me No Good". The song failed at radio, only reaching No. 43, giving Wilson her first set of consecutive singles to not make the Top 40 of the country chart. The song was initially the lead-off single to the album, I Got Your Country Right Here, which had been delayed several times. A second single, "If I Could Do It All Again," became the first single of her career to not chart at all. Despite exiting Sony Music Nashville in July 2009, Wilson released the album via Redneck Records, her own record label, in 2010, and achieved a Top 20 hit with its lead single, "Work Hard, Play Harder."

In 2013, Wilson released three new albums via Redneck Records. The first, Right on Time, was her fifth studio album, which charted two country singles in "Still Rollin'" and "Crazy," though neither made the Top 40. The second and third — Under the Covers and Christmas in My Heart — consisted of cover songs of classic rock and Christmas music, respectively. She also released her first live album, Still Here for the Party, in October 2014 to commemorate the tenth anniversary of her debut release.

Studio albums

2000s

2010s

Christmas albums

Live albums

Compilation albums

Singles

2000s

2010s

Other singles

Featured singles

Other charted songs

Videography

Music videos

Guest appearances

Notes
A^ "Politically Uncorrect" originally charted as an album cut in October 2005 before being confirmed as a single.
B^ "Red Bird Fever" was a digital single, set to the tune of "Redneck Woman", released in November 2004 in tribute to the St. Louis Cardinals.

References

Country music discographies
 
 
Discographies of American artists